Poecilasthena cisseres is a moth of the family Geometridae first described by Alfred Jefferis Turner in 1933. It is found in Australia, including Victoria.

Original description

References

External links

Australian Faunal Directory

New Australian Lepidoptera (1933)

Moths of Australia
Moths described in 1933
Poecilasthena